Temple of the Moon may refer to:

 Temple of the Moon (Yemen), moon God of the pre-Islamic Yemeni kingdom of Saba, with temples near Ma'rib
 Temple of the Moon (China), a Ming dynasty altar in Beijing built in the 16th century AD
 Temple of the Moon (Peru), an Incan ruin on Huayna Picchu near Machu Picchu built in the 15th century AD
 Temple of the Moon (Utah), a summit in Capitol Reef National Park, US
 "Temple of the Moon", a song by the Austrian band Dargaard from the 1998 album Eternity Rites

See also
 Moon Temple (Chía), constructed by the Muisca in Chía, Cundinamarca, Colombia
 Pyramid of the Moon, San Juan Teotihuacán, Mexico, constructed 100–450 AD